Mohammed Khair-Eddine (1941 – November 18, 1995) was a Moroccan poet and writer. He was among the most famous Moroccan Berber literary figures of the 20th century.

Life
Mohammed Khaïr-Eddine was born in Tafraout, a Berber town in the Souss-Massa-Drâa region (Tiznit province), in the south of Morocco, 180 km south of Agadir.

As a young writer, he joined the circle of writers known as  the Amitiés littéraires et artistiques in Casablanca. In 1964 Khair-Eddir founded the "Poésie Toute" movement. In 1965 he was exiled to France where he spent years working in factories. In 1967 he started publishing again, writing for "Lettres nouvelles" and "Présence africaine". Mohammed Khair-Eddine returned to Morocco in 1979.

Khair-Eddine died in Rabat November 18, 1995.

Selected works
Agadir (1967): The author is very much taken by the "séisme" of 1960, he moves to Agadir in 1961 and stays there until 1963.
Résurrection des fleurs sauvages (Éditions Stouky, Rabat, 1981).
Légende et vie d' Agoun'chich (Le Seuil, 1984).

Éditions du Seuil 
For the most part his works have been published by Éditions du Seuil:
Corps négatif
Histoire d'un Bon Dieu
Soleil arachnide
Moi l'aigre
Le Déterreur
Ce Maroc!
Une odeur de manthèque
Une vie, un rêve, un peuple 
Toujours errants
Légende et vie d'Agoun'chich
Résurrection des fleurs sauvages

External links
  limag.refer.org

References
 

Berber writers
Berber poets
Moroccan male poets
Moroccan writers
1941 births
1995 deaths
Moroccan writers in French
20th-century Moroccan poets
People from Tafraout
20th-century poets
Shilha people